Vishnu Sahasranama, is a Sanskrit hymn which contains a list of 1,000 names of Vishnu, one of the main deities in Hinduism and the supreme God in Vaishnavism. It is one of the most sacred and popular stotras in Hinduism. The Vishnu Sahasranama as found in the Anushasana Parva of the epic Mahabharata. 
It is the most popular version of the 1,000 names of Vishnu. Other versions exist in the Padma Purana, Skanda Purana and Garuda Purana. There is also a Sikh Version of the Vishnu Sahasranama, as found in the work Sundar Gutka.

Background
In the 135th chapter of  Anushāsanaparva (verses 14 to 120) in Mahabharata, the stotra was given to Yudhishthira by the grandsire of Kuru dynasty and warrior Bhishma who was on his death bed (of arrows) in the battlefield of Kurukshetra. Yudhishthira asks Bhishma the following questions:

Bhishma answers by stating that mankind will be free from all sorrows by chanting the  Vishnu Sahasranama, which are the thousand names of the all-pervading Supreme Being Vishnu, who is the master of all the worlds, the supreme light, the essence of the universe and who is Brahman. All matter animate and inanimate reside in him, and he in turn resides within all matter.

Etymology
In Sanskrit,  means 'thousand'. The meaning of sahasra is situation dependent.  (nominative, the stem is ) means 'name'. The compound is of the Bahuvrihi type and may be translated as 'having a thousand names'. In modern Hindi pronunciation, nāma is pronounced [na:m]. It is also pronounced  in South India.

The phala shruthi [Phala = results Śruti = that which is heard] says that one who reads this Vishnu Sahasranamam every day with full devotion achieves name, fame, wealth and knowledge in his life.

Interpretations
The Vishnu Sahasranama is popular among Hindus, and a major part of prayer for devout Vaishnavas, or followers of Vishnu. While Vaishanvas venerate other deities, they believe that the universe, including the other divinities such as Shiva and Devi, is ultimately a manifestation of the Supreme Lord Vishnu. Despite the existence of other sahasranamas of other gods, referring a sahasranama as "The Sahasranama," generally refers to the Vishnu Sahasranama alone, thereby indicating its wide popularity and use.

Two of the names in Vishnu Sahasranama that refer to Shiva are "Shiva" (names # 27 and # 600 in Advaitin Adi Shankara's commentary) itself, "Shambhu" (name # 38), "Ishanah" (name #6 4), and "Rudra" (name # 114). Adi Sankara of Advaita Vedanta asserts that the deity Vishnu is Brahman itself (not just an aspect of Brahmam). Again, he notes that "only Hari (Vishnu) is eulogized by names such as Shiva", a position consistent with interpretations of the Srivaishnavite commentator Parasara Bhattar. Parasara Bhattar had interpreted Shiva to mean a quality of Vishnu, such as "One who bestows auspiciousness".

However, this interpretation of the name Shiva has been challenged by Swami Tapasyananda's translation of Shankara's  commentary on the Vishnu Sahasranama. He translates the 27th name, Shiva to mean:"One who is not affected by the three Gunas of Prakrti, Sattva, Rajas,and Tamas; The Kaivalaya Upanishad says, "He is both Brahma and Shiva." In the light of this statement of non-difference between Shiva and Vishnu, it is Vishnu Himself Who Is exalted by the praise and worship of Shiva." Based on this commonly held Advaitan point of view which has been adopted by Smartas, Vishnu and Shiva are viewed as one and the same God, being different aspects of preservation and destruction respectively. As many Sanskrit words have multiple meanings, it is possible that both Vishnu and Shiva share names in this instance, e.g., the name Shiva itself means "auspicious" which could also apply to Vishnu. The Deities Ananthapadmanabha and Shankaranarayana are worshipped by Hindus, as is Lord Panduranga Vitthala, a form of Lord Krishna with a Shiva Linga on his crown, signifying the oneness of both deities.

However, the Vaishnava commentator, Parasara Bhattar, a follower of Ramanujacharya has interpreted the names "Shiva" and "Rudra" in Vishnu Sahasranama to mean qualities or attributes of Vishnu, and not to indicate that Vishnu and Shiva are one and the same God. Vaishnavas worship Vishnu in his four-armed form, carrying conch, disc, flower and mace in his hands, believing that to be the Supreme form. However, Smarthas do not subscribe to this aspect or personification of God, as Smarthas say that God is Nirguna and thus devoid of form. Additionally, they believe that God is not limited by time nor limited by shape and color. Vaishnava traditions are of the opinion that Vishnu is both unlimited and yet still capable of having specific forms, as to give arguments to the contrary (to say that God is incapable of having a form) is to limit the unlimitable and all-powerful Supreme.

In the Sri Vaishnava and Sadh Vaishnava tradition, the Bhagavad-gita and the Vishnu Sahasranama are considered the two eyes of spiritual revelation.

In other Vaishnava traditions too, the Vishnu Sahasranama is considered an important text. Within Gaudiya Vaishnavism, Vallabha sampradaya, Nimbarka sampradaya and among Ramanandis, the chanting of the names of Krishna and Rama are considered to be superior to that of Vishnu. Based on another verse in the Padma Purana which says that the benefit of chanting the one thousand names of Vishnu can be derived from chanting one name of Rama, and a verse in the Brahma Vaivarta Purana equating the benefit of chanting three names of Rama with one name of Krishna. However, it is important to realize that those verses in those puranas are not to be interpreted literally, as many believe that there is no difference between Vishnu and Krishna. This theological difference can be expressed as follows: Many Vaishnava groups recognize Krishna as an Avatar of Vishnu, while others, instead, consider Him to be svayam bhagavan, or the original form of the Lord. Yet these verses can be interpreted as it is more important to have pure bhakti or devotion than merely repeating the many names of God without emotion. Indeed, Shri Krishna Himself said, "Arjuna, One may be desirous of praising by reciting the thousand names. But, on my part, I feel praised by one shloka. There is no doubt about it.” 

Within Vaisnavism some groups, such as Sri sampradaya, adhere to and follow the Rig Veda: 1.156.3, which states "O ye who wish to gain realization of the supreme truth, utter the name of Vishnu at least once in the steadfast faith that it will lead you to such realization."

Interpretations alluding to the power of God in controlling karma

Many names in the Vishnusahasranama, the thousand names of Vishnu allude to the power of God in controlling karma. For example, the 135th name of Vishnu, Dharmadhyaksha, in Sankara's interpretation means, "One who directly sees the merits (Dharma) and demerits (Adharma), of beings by bestowing their due rewards on them."

Other names of Vishnu alluding to this nature of God are Bhavanah, the 32nd name, Vidhata, the 44th name, Apramattah, the 325th name, Sthanadah, the 387th name and Srivibhavanah, the 609th name.  Bhavanah, according to Sankara's interpretation, means "One who generates the fruits of Karmas of all Jivas for them to enjoy." The Brahma Sutra (3.2.28) "Phalmatah upapatteh" speaks of the Lord's function as the bestower of the fruits of all actions of the jivas.

General thoughts

Sections from Swami Tapasyananda's translation of the concluding verses of Vishnu Sahasranama, state the following: "Nothing evil or inauspicious will befall a man here or hereafter who daily hears or repeats these names." That comment is noteworthy. King Nahusha, a once righteous king, ancestor of Yudhishthira, after performing a hundred Ashwamedha sacrifices, became king of devas, but was later expelled from Swarga or heaven due to a curse by the great sage Agastya due to his pride and arrogance and became a python for thousands of years. In the commentary to this sloka Sankara states that a fall akin to that of king Nahusha will not happen to that devotee who recites Vishnu Sahasranama daily.

Merits of recitation
Believers in the recitation of the Sahasranama claim that it brings unwavering calm of mind, complete freedom from stress and brings eternal knowledge. A translation of the concluding verses (Phalasruti) of Vishnu Sahasranama, state the following: "Nothing evil or inauspicious will befall a man here or hereafter who daily hears or repeats these names... Whichever devoted man, getting up early in the morning and purifying himself, repeats this hymn devoted to Vasudeva, with a mind that is concentrated on Him, that man attains to great fame, leadership among his peers, wealth that is secure and the supreme good unsurpassed by anything. He will be free from all fears and be endowed with great courage and energy and he will be free from diseases. Beauty of form, strength of body and mind, and virtuous character will be natural to him.... One who reads this hymn every day with devotion and attention attains to peace of mind, patience, prosperity, mental stability, memory and reputation.... Whoever desires advancement and happiness should repeat this devotional hymn on Vishnu composed by Vyasa.... Never will defeat attend on a man who adores the Lotus-Eyed One [Kamala Nayana], who is the Master of all the worlds, who is birthless, and out of whom the worlds have originated and into whom they dissolve."

In orthodox Hindu tradition, a devotee should daily chant the Upanishads, Gita, Rudram, Purusha Sukta and Vishnu Sahasranama. If one cannot do all this on any day, it is believed that chanting Vishnu Sahasranama alone is sufficient. Vishnu Sahasranama can be chanted at any time, irrespective of gender.

Varahi Tantra says that in the age of Kali yuga, most stotras are cursed by Parashurama and hence are ineffective. While listing the ones which are free from this curse and hence suitable during Kali Yuga, it is said, "Gita of the Bhishma Parva, Vishnu Sahasranama of Mahabharata and Chandika Saptashati' (Devi Mahatmyam) are free from all doshas and grant fruits immediately in Kali Yuga."

In a classic astrological text, the Bṛhat Parāśara Horāśāstra, sage Parashara frequently recommends the recitation of the Vishnu Sahasranama as the best remedial measure for planetary afflictions.
For example, see the following verse:
"The most effective and beneficial remedial measure for the prolongation of longevity and to obtain relief from other evil effects is recitation of Vishnu Sahasranam." Ch. 56, verse 30 

Sage Parashara mentions this practice more than ten times in his text as in this further verse:

"The remedial measure to obtain relief from the above evil effects, is recitation of Vishnu Sahasranama." Ch. 59, verse 77 

In his celebrated Ayurvedic text Charaka Samhita, Acharya Charaka refers to the power of Vishnu Sahasranama in curing all kinds of fever.

viṣṇuṁ sahasramūrdhānaṁ carācarapatiṁ vibhum|| 311
stuvannāmasahasrēṇa jvarān sarvānapōhati|
Recitation of the sahasra nāma (one thousand names) of Lord Viṡnū, who has one thousand heads, who is the chief of the carācara (moving and non-moving things of the universe) and who is omnipresent cures all type of jwaras.

Shlokas

Recitation and aggregation
An alternative approach is to say the starting prayer, and then say the names collected in stanzas (As they were originally said by Bhishma.) Such stanzas are called Slokas in Sanskrit. The Sahasranama (apart from the initial and concluding prayers) has a total of 108 shlokas.

For example, the first sloka is:
 om visvam vishnur-vashatkaro bhutbhavyabhavatprabhuh
 bhutkrd bhutbhrd-bhaavo bhutatma bhutabhavanah

Notice the aggregation of several words and the omission of their intervening spaces. For example, the last word of the first line of this Sloka:
 bhutabhavya-bhavatprabhuh

corresponds to:
 om bhutabhavya bhavat prabhave namah
of the expanded version.

This joining-together of words is a common feature of Sanskrit and is called Samasa- a compound. It makes the slokas compact, and easier to remember.

The Thousand Names of Lord Vishnu 

This is the complete list of names, in loose anglicized spelling and with idiosyncratic translations. Sanskrit has multiple meanings to a single word, notice how Brahma and Brahmaa differ. One may contemplate over understanding each name for a minute to one's lifetime. For example, He is both Vishwam and Vishnuh. [Is the universe in Him ? or Does He pervade everywhere?]

Mentions, Quotes and Commentaries

Mentions
 Adi Shankara of Advaita Vedanta in Verse 27 of Bhaja Govindam, said that the Gita and Vishnusahasranama should be chanted and the form of the Lord of Lakshmi, Vishnu should always be meditated on. He also said that the Sahasranama bestowed all noble virtues on those who chanted it.
Parasara Bhattar, a follower of Ramanujacharya had said that Vishnusahasranama absolves people of all sins and has no equal
Madhvacharya, propounder of Dvaita philosophy, said that the Sahasranama was the essence of the Mahabharata, which in turn was the essence of the Sastras and that each word of the Sahasranama had 100 meanings.
Swaminarayan, founder of the Hindu Swaminarayan faith, said in verse 118 of the scripture, Shikshapatri, that one should "either recite or have the 10th canto,(of Bhagavata Purana ) and also other holy scriptures like the "Vishnusahasranama" recited at a holy place according to one's capacity. "The recital is such that it gives fruits according to whatever is desired."
 Swaminarayan also said in verses 93–96, "I have the highest esteem for these eight holy scriptures: 1-4)the four Vedas, 5) the Vyas-Sutra,(i.e., Brahma Sutras, 6) the Shrimad Bhagavatam, 7) Shri Vishnusahasranama in the Mahabharata, and 8) the Yajnavalkya Smrti which is at the center of the Dharma Scriptures; and all My disciples who wish to prosper should listen to these eight holy scriptures, and the brahmanas under my shelter should learn and teach these holy scriptures, and read them to others."
Swami Sivananda, in his twenty important spiritual instructions, stated that the Vishnusahasranama, along with other religious texts, should be studied systematically.

Quotes
Sri N. Krishnamachari, a Vaishnavite scholar, at Stephen Knapp's website, quoting Vaishnavite scholars, states that there are six reasons for the greatness of Vishnusahasranama:

Quote by A. C. Bhaktivedanta Swami Prabhupada; on February 15, 1970, to J.F.Staal; Professor of Philosophy and of South Asian Languages. Second paragraph, states:

Lord Shiva addressed his wife, Parvati:
sri rama rama rameti rame rame manorame
  sahasranama tat tulyam rama nama varanane
This translates to:

O Varanana (lovely-faced lady), I chant the holy name of Rama, Rama, Rama and thus constantly enjoy this beautiful sound. This holy name of Sri Rama is equal to one thousand holy names of Lord Vishnu." (Brhad Visnusahasranamastotra, Uttara-khanda, Padma Purana 72.335)

Brahmānda Purana said:
sahasra-namnam punyanam, trir-avrttya tu yat phalam
 ekavrttya tu krsnasya, namaikam tat prayacchati

This translates to:

"The pious results (punya) achieved by chanting the thousand holy names of Vishnu (Vishnusahasranama-Stotram) three times can be attained by only one utterance of the holy name of Krishna."

Lord Krishna Himself said:
yo mam nama sahasrena stotum icchati pandava
sohamekena slokena stuta eva na samsaya

This translates to:

:"Arjuna, One may be desirous of praising by reciting the thousand names. But, on my part, I feel praised by one sloka. There is no doubt about it.”

From the oldest scriptural text in Hinduism, the Rig Veda; I.156.3b, it states:
"O ye who wish to gain realization of the Supreme Truth, utter the name of "Vishnu" at least once in the steadfast faith that it will lead you to such realization."

Commentaries
The Vishnu Sahasranama has been the subject of numerous commentaries: 
Adi Shankara of Advaita Vedanta wrote a definitive commentary on the Sahasranama in the 8th century. 
Parasara Bhattar, a follower of Ramanuja, wrote a commentary in the 12th century, detailing the names of Vishnu from a Vishishtadvaita perspective,  in the book titled Bhagavath Guna Dharpanam (or Bhagavad Guna Dharpana, meaning reflections of the Lord's qualities). 
Madhvacharya of Dvaita Vedanta asserted that each name in the sahasranama has a minimum of 100 meanings.
Vidyadhiraja Tirtha (died 1392) (disciple of Jayatirtha) of Dvaita Vedanta wrote a commentary on Vishnu Sahasranama called .
Satyanidhi Tirtha (died 1660) of Dvaita Vedanta wrote Vishnu Sahasranama Vyakhyana, a commentary on Vishnu Sahasranama.
Satyasandha Tirtha (died 1794) of Dvaita Vedanta wrote  Viṣṇusahasranāmabhāṣya, a commentary on Vishnu Sahasranama.

See also
 Hare Krishna
 Sandhyavandhanam
 Brahmin
 Bhadrakalpikasutra
 Vaijanthimala

Notes

Bibliography

Footnotes

References
. With an English Translation of Sri Sankara Bhagavatpada's Commentary
. Sanskrit and English, with an English translation of Sri Sankara Bhagavatpada's commentary.

Further reading
 Sanskrit & Hindi: Sri Vishnu Sahasranama, Gita Press, Gorakhpur, Uttar Pradesh 273005, India
 Sanskrit & English: The Thousand Names of Vishnu and the Satyanarayana Vrat, translated by Swami Satyananda Saraswati, Devi Mandir, Napa.

Other translations:
 Sanskrit & Gujarati: Sri Vishnu Sahasranama Stotram; translated by Shri Yogeshwarji, India @ www.swargarohan.org
 Sanskrit & English: Sri Vishnu Sahasranama Stotram; translated by Swami Vimalananda, Sri Ramakrishna Tapovanam, Tiruchirapalli, India, 1985

External links

The original Sanskrit at Wikisource.

 Excerpt from the Mahabharata translation by Ganguly at Sacred Texts.

Vaishnava texts
 
Sahasranama
Mahabharata
Names of Vishnu